The Bauer Palace is a house-palace located in Madrid, Spain. Building was made in the 18th century and purchased by Ignacio Bauer in the 19th century. It was declared Bien de Interés Cultural in 1972.

References 

Bauer
Bien de Interés Cultural landmarks in Madrid
Buildings and structures in Universidad neighborhood, Madrid